John Hayward Williams (born June 17, 1953) is an American film producer known for his work both in live-action and in animation. He is mainly known for Shrek (2001), Shrek 2 (2004), Shrek the Third (2007), and Shrek Forever After (2010). He is the founder and owner of his own company, Vanguard Films which produces live-action and animated (through its sister skein Vanguard Animation) products.

Life and career 
Williams was born in Manhattan, New York City, on June 17, 1953.

In 2001 shortly after working on Shrek, Williams founded Vanguard Animation and started working on projects such as Valiant (2005), Happily N'Ever After (2007), Space Chimps (2008) and its sequel Space Chimps 2: Zartog Strikes Back.

He made his directorial debut on Space Chimps 2: Zartog Strikes Back.

Vanguard Comics 
On June 6, 2008, John Williams along with Platinum Studios created a new label called Vanguard Comics.

3QU Media 
In 2014, partnering with Henry Skelsy, formed 3QU Media as a specialist in CG-animated feature films for the international marketplace. 3QU Media is producing in association with WV Enterprises. Williams is producing and SC Films International is handling foreign sales.

Filmography

References

External links
Vanguard Animation
"About Us" at Vanguard Animation website

Living people
American animators
American film directors
American film producers
American animated film directors
American animated film producers
DreamWorks Animation people
Place of birth missing (living people)
1953 births